is the eighth single by Do As Infinity, released in 2001. "Tōku Made" was the theme song to the anime movie Vampire Hunter D: Bloodlust and was also used during the final episode of the first series of the Japanese TV drama "Waterboys". "Signal" was the theme song to a Lavenus hair care TV commercial which starred the lead vocalist, Tomiko Van.

This song was included in the band's compilation albums Do the Best and Do the A-side.

Track listing
 
 
  (Instrumental) 
  (Instrumental)

Chart positions

External links
 "Tōku Made" at Avex Network
 "Tōku Made" at Oricon

2001 singles
Do As Infinity songs
Songs written by Dai Nagao
Song recordings produced by Seiji Kameda
2001 songs
Avex Trax singles
Japanese film songs
Songs written for animated films